The 2017–18 season was Unione Sportiva Sassuolo Calcio's fifth consecutive season in the top-flight of Italian football. The club competed in Serie A and the Coppa Italia following a 12th-place finish last season, finishing 11th and being eliminated in the round of 16 respectively.

On 13 June 2017 coach Eusebio Di Francesco was appointed as Roma manager; Cristian Bucchi was appointed to manage the club on 20 June.

Players

Squad information

Transfers

In

Loans in

Out

Loans out

Pre-season and friendlies

Competitions

Serie A

League table

Results summary

Results by round

Matches

Coppa Italia

Statistics

Appearances and goals

|-
! colspan=14 style=background:#DCDCDC; text-align:center| Goalkeepers

|-
! colspan=14 style=background:#DCDCDC; text-align:center| Defenders

|-
! colspan=14 style=background:#DCDCDC; text-align:center| Midfielders

|-
! colspan=14 style=background:#DCDCDC; text-align:center| Forwards

|-
! colspan=14 style=background:#DCDCDC; text-align:center| Players transferred out during the season

Goalscorers

Last updated: 20 May 2018

Clean sheets

Last updated: 20 May 2018

Disciplinary record

Last updated: 20 May 2018

References

U.S. Sassuolo Calcio seasons
Sassuolo